Edoardo Monteforte or Eduardo Monteforte (1849–1933) was an Italian painter.

Monteforte was born in Polla, Province of Salerno. He studied in the Academy of Fine Arts of Naples under Achille Carillo and Gabriele Smargiassi, painting luminous land- and seascapes. He painted both in oil and watercolor, and was very prolific. In 1877 at Naples, he exhibited: a domenica d' ottobre verso Pompei; and two watercolors titled: Sulla spiaggia and Inverno. In 1881 at Milan, he exhibited Parco Spinelli, Il ritorno dalla pesca, and Il ritorno da Sorrento. At the 1883 Exhibition in Milan, he displayed  Vento fresco, Marina Sorrentina, and Costa Sorrentina. In 1884 at Turin, he exhibited Il ritorno dalla pesca; Monte Scutari, and Mattinata pel bosco. After a trip to Egypt, he painted a number of Orientalist subjects, including  A sera per l'Alto Nilo, Tomb of the Caliph in Cairo, exhibited in 1898 at Turin. He died in Naples.

References

19th-century Italian painters
Italian male painters
20th-century Italian painters
1849 births
1933 deaths
Painters from Naples
Italian landscape painters
19th-century Italian male artists
20th-century Italian male artists